A referendum on national communal taxes was held in Liechtenstein on 21 October 1990. The proposal was rejected by 76.0% of voters.

Results

References

1990 referendums
1990 in Liechtenstein
Referendums in Liechtenstein
October 1990 events in Europe